Petronille Vaweka is a humanitarian NGO activist and was the interim chairperson of the Ituri Interim Assembly of Ituri Interim Administration, while in transition from the status of a district of Orientale Province to a province of the Democratic Republic of the Congo. She worked with the Ituri Pacification Commission in 2003, which helped establish the assembly. In addition, she was elected as Ituri's representative to the National Assembly.

Formerly, Mrs. Vaweka was the head of Fondation Paix Durable.

See also
 Ituri Interim Administration

External links
 Interview

Ituri Interim Administration
Year of birth missing (living people)
Living people